18 posyolok is a rural locality (a settlement) in Shatura Urban Settlement of Shatursky District, Russia. The population was 52 as of 2010.

Geography 
18 posyolok is located 269 km northwest of Shatura (the district's administrative centre) by road.

Streets 
There are no streets with titles.

References 

Rural localities in Moscow Oblast
Shatursky District